The 5000 and 10000 metres distances for men in the 2011–12 ISU Speed Skating World Cup were contested over six races on six occasions, out of a total of seven World Cup occasions for the season, with the first occasion taking place in Chelyabinsk, Russia, on 18–20 November 2011, and the final occasion taking place in Berlin, Germany, on 9–11 March 2012.

Dutch skaters dominated the 5000/10000 distance, taking 15 out of 18 available podium places over the season, including all gold and silver medals, and only letting three bronze medals slip to other countries' skaters. Bob de Jong successfully defended his title from the previous season, while his countrymen Sven Kramer and Jorrit Bergsma came second and third, respectively.

Top three

Race medallists

Standings 
Standings as of 11 March 2012 (end of the season).

References 

Men 5000